Arthur Reginald Dorrell (30 March 1896 – 13 September 1942) was an English international footballer who played on the left-wing. He was the son of former Villa player William Dorrell. He played for Aston Villa between 1919 and 1931, scoring 65 goals in 390 appearances and winning four England caps. He played in both the 1920 and 1924 FA Cup finals, the first of which Villa won. He then retired after a season with Port Vale.

Early and personal life
Arthur Reginald Dorrell was born on 30 March 1896 in Small Heath, Birmingham, Warwickshire. He was the third of four children to William and Clara; his father was a professional footballer, as well as a licensed victualler and turner. His father married a further two times, having a child with each woman. Dorrell enlisted as an engineers fitter in the Army on 24 October 1914, serving throughout World War I until being demobbed on 20 May 1919. Dorrell married Sarah Jane Clewlow in 1922, and the couple had a daughter, Marjorie. Dorrell died on 13 September 1942 at The Pelham Arms in Alum Rock, Birmingham, and his funeral was held three days later at Erdington Parish Church; the pallbearers were Frank Moss, Joe Bradford, Billy Kirton, Dicky York, George Blackburn and Eric Houghton.

Club career

Aston Villa
Dorrell played for Carey Hall and R.A.S.C., before joining Aston Villa in May 1919. He made 19 appearances in the 1919–20 season, as Villa posted a ninth-place finish in the First Division. He also played in the 1920 FA Cup Final, as Villa claimed the FA Cup for the sixth time with a 1–0 win over Huddersfield Town at Stamford Bridge. He featured 39 times in 1920–21, as Villa finished tenth in the league. He bagged six goals in 48 appearances in 1921–22, helping Villa to fifth in the league. Dorrell scored seven goals in 42 games in 1922–23, as Villa slipped a place to sixth. They finished sixth again in 1923–24, with Dorrell scoring five goals in 45 games. He also played in the 1924 FA Cup Final at Wembley, which ended in a 2–0 defeat to Newcastle United.

The club slipped to 15th place in 1924–25, despite Dorrell scoring eight goals in 45 appearances. He hit five goals in 42 games in 1925–26, as Villa rose back to sixth. Villa finished tenth in 1926–27, with Dorrell scoring eight goals in 39 games. He then hit nine goals in 39 games in 1927–28, as the "Villans" rose two places to eighth. They then finished third in 1928–29, with Dorrell hitting nine goals in 29 appearances. However, he featured just three times in 1929–30, as Villa finished in fourth spot. He played no part at all in the 1930–31 campaign, as the club finished as runners-up to Arsenal. He made a total of 390 appearances in all competitions for the club, scoring 65 goals.

Port Vale
He signed with Port Vale in June 1931, along with long-time Villa teammate Richard York. He scored five goals in 34 Second Division games in the 1931–32 campaign, helping the "Valiants" to narrowly avoid relegation. Now aged 36, he took the decision to retire from football in May 1932. Upon his retirement as a player, he returned to Aston Villa as a coach.

International career
Dorrell made his England debut on 8 December 1924, in a 4–0 win over Belgium at The Hawthorns. His second cap came against Wales on 28 February 1925, in a 2–1 win at Vetch Field, as part of the 1925 British Home Championship. On 21 May 1925, he scored in a 3–2 win over France in a friendly at the Stade Olympique Yves-du-Manoir. His fourth and final cap came on 24 October 1925, in a goalless draw with Ireland at Windsor Park in the 1926 British Home Championship.

Statistics

Club statistics
Source:

International statistics

Honours
Aston Villa
FA Cup: 1920; runner-up: 1924

References

1896 births
1942 deaths
People from Small Heath, Birmingham
Footballers from Birmingham, West Midlands
British Army personnel of World War I
English footballers
England international footballers
Association football wingers
Port Vale F.C. players
Aston Villa F.C. players
English Football League players
English Football League representative players
Association football coaches
Aston Villa F.C. non-playing staff
FA Cup Final players